Newlands Beck is a minor river of Cumbria in England.

The beck rises on Dale Head and flows northwards through the picturesque Newlands Valley, past the settlement of Little Town and between Braithwaite and Portinscale before flowing into Bassenthwaite Lake north east of Thornthwaite.

Tributaries
 Chapel Beck
 Comb Beck
 Comb Gill
 Black Gill
 Grisedale Gill
 Sanderson Gill
 Hallgarth Beck
 Masmill Beck
 Pow Beck
 Coledale Beck
 Barrow Gill
 Birkthwaite Beck
 Pudding Beck
 Pow Beck
 Stonycroft Gill
 Rigg Beck
 Yewthwaite Gill
 Keskadale Beck
 Ill Gill
 Ard Gill
 Dudmanscomb Gill
 High Hole Beck
 Moss Beck
 Scope Beck
 Deep Gill
 Parrocks Gill
 Barnes Gill
 Near Broadgill
 Lewthwaite Gill
 Far Broadgill
 Step Gill
 Near Tongue Gill
 Far Tongue Gill

Rivers of Cumbria
1Newlands